Kathlyn Ann Parker is a chemist known for her work on synthesis of compounds, especially organic compounds with biological roles. She is an elected fellow of the American Chemical Society and a recipient of the Garvan–Olin Medal in chemistry.

Education and career 
Parker graduated from Senn High School in Chicago. She went on to receive a B.A. from Northwestern University (1966). While in college she won an award from the student chapter of the American Institute of Chemists for her essay "Chemistry as a Profession" making her the first woman to receive this award. She earned her Ph.D. from Stanford University in 1970. Following her Ph.D. she was a postdoctoral research at Columbia University. From 1973 until 2001 Parker was in the chemistry department at Brown University. In 2001 she moved to Stony Brook University, and in 2017 she was named a distinguished professor at Stony Brook University.

Research 
Parker is known for her work in the field of organic synthesis, where she works on the construction of natural products through methods that allow for efficient synthesis of known organic compounds.

Selected publications

Awards and honors 
In 1987 Parker was a fellow of the John Simon Guggenheim Foundation. In 2009 the Parker was elected a fellow of the American Chemical Society and she received the Francis P. Garvan-John M. Olin Medal from the American Chemical Society. In 2017 she received the Arthur C. Cope Scholar Award in recognition of her work synthesizing organic compounds.

References 

Living people
Northwestern University alumni
Stanford University alumni
Stony Brook University faculty
Women chemists
Organic chemists
Fellows of the American Chemical Society
Year of birth missing (living people)